IdeaSpark Labs Inc. (trade name: Beamdog) is a Canadian video game developer founded in 2009 by BioWare co-founder Trent Oster and former BioWare lead programmer Cameron Tofer. Beamdog's distribution service was launched in July 2010.

History 
Beamdog was founded in 2009 by Trent Oster and Cameron Tofer. It has employees in locations throughout the United States and Australia, Russia, and the UK.

Overhaul Games is a division of Beamdog. Originally, it was a part of Beamdog, but following the release of MDK2 for Wii, a discrete studio was founded to work on MDK2 HD. The name Overhaul Games was chosen to reflect the company's work on MDK2 HD as they had overhauled the game into a next generation game. Since 2012, the Overhaul team has also released several enhanced editions of Infinity Engine games as well.

Aspyr through its parent Embracer Group announced its acquisition of Beamdog in April 2022 for an undisclosed sum.

Games

 MDK2 (2011) – Wii port developed by Beamdog, published by Interplay
 MDK2 HD (2012) – Developed by Overhaul Games, published by Interplay
 Baldur's Gate: Enhanced Edition (2012) – Developed by Overhaul Games, published by Beamdog
 Baldur's Gate II: Enhanced Edition (2013) – Developed by Overhaul Games, published by Beamdog
 Icewind Dale: Enhanced Edition (2014) – Developed by Overhaul Games, published by Beamdog
 Baldur's Gate: Siege of Dragonspear (2016) – Developed and published by Beamdog
 Planescape: Torment: Enhanced Edition (2017) - Developed by Overhaul Games, published by Beamdog
 Neverwinter Nights: Enhanced Edition (2018) - Developed and published by Beamdog
 Axis & Allies 1942 Online (2019  (early access) / 2021 (full release)) - Developed and published by Beamdog
 MythForce (2022 early access) - Developed by Beamdog, published by Aspyr

In addition, Beamdog also offer official soundtracks to games for download as well as "digital deluxe" versions with the original and additional music included. The Siege of Dragonspear is also available in a collectors edition as well.

Beamdog Client 
Beamdog Client is an online-based game software program (similar to Steam), which allows players to keep their games up to date with the latest fixes and enhancements. It also allows players access to the latest content from Beamdog, as well as a forum for testing or providing game feedback.

References

External links
 

Canadian companies established in 2009
Video game companies established in 2009
2009 establishments in Alberta
Video game companies of Canada
Video game publishers
Video game development companies
Companies based in Edmonton
2022 mergers and acquisitions
Saber Interactive
Canadian subsidiaries of foreign companies